Iona University (formerly Iona College) is a private Catholic college in New Rochelle, New York.

Iona College may also refer to:
 Iona College Brisbane, Australia
 Iona College, Havelock North, Hawkes Bay, New Zealand
 Iona Presentation College, Perth, Western Australia
 Iona College (Windsor, Ontario), Windsor, Ontario, Canada